Lydicamycin is an organic compound with the molecular formula C47H74N4O10. Lydicamycin is an antibiotic with activity against Gram-positive bacteria. The bacteria Streptomyces lydicamycinicus and Streptomyces platensis produces lydicamycin.

References

Further reading 

 
 
 
 

Antibiotics
Pyrrolidines
Enols
Guanidines